Halvian may refer to:
 Halavan-e Pain